The Ancient Tomb School is a fictional martial arts school in the wuxia novel The Return of the Condor Heroes by Jin Yong. It plays a significant role in the early development of the protagonists, Yang Guo and Xiaolongnü. It was named after its base, the Ancient Tomb in Mount Zhongnan.

History 
The school was founded by Lin Chaoying during the Song dynasty and shares a long history with its neighbour, the Quanzhen School, which is based in Chongyang Palace on Mount Zhongnan. The Ancient Tomb was built by the Quanzhen School's founder, Wang Chongyang. Although it is called a tomb, it was actually used to store supplies and weapons in preparation for war against invaders from the Jurchen-ruled Jin Empire. The tomb is also filled with various traps and hidden rooms and serves as a hideout for the defending forces of the Song dynasty.

Wang Chongyang attempted to rally an army of volunteers to defend their homeland from the Jin invaders but failed. He was upset by his failure and retreated to live a reclusive life inside the tomb, calling himself a "living dead man". As such the Ancient Tomb is also called the "Tomb of the Living Dead". Wang's lover, Lin Chaoying, felt that his talent would go to waste if he continued to be a hermit, so she tricked him into leaving the tomb and both of them roamed the jianghu together. However, Wang was still very concerned about his native land and he treated Lin coldly. Lin thought that Wang looked down on her and so she challenged him to a fight on Mount Zhongnan. Lin defeated Wang by trickery and won the Ancient Tomb as her prize. She moved into the tomb and had never left since then.

Lin hated Wang for not appreciating her love for him and she spent her time innovating and developing new martial arts techniques to counter those of Quanzhen's. She created the Jade Maiden Heart Sutra, which proves to be the bane of Quanzhen martial arts as its movements seem to oppose all Quanzhen styles. However, it is later discovered that the Jade Maiden Heart Sutra actually complements Quanzhen's swordplay and covers its flaws.

Lin Chaoying had a maid, who became her martial arts apprentice. The school got its name from its base since Lin did not give it a name and martial artists in the jianghu could only refer to it as the "Ancient Tomb School". The maid later accepted Xiaolongnü and Li Mochou as her apprentices. Li Mochou was banished from the school for betraying her master and she continued to roam the jianghu as a vicious killer. The school only becomes known to the jianghu after Li Mochou became a notorious murderer. Xiaolongnü later accepts Yang Guo as her apprentice and Yang Guo becomes the first male member of the school. In the sequel, The Heaven Sword and Dragon Saber, Yang Guo and Xiaolongnü have a female descendant, known as the Yellow Dress Maiden, who uses the Nine Yin Manual'''s skills to defeat Zhou Zhiruo.

 Skills and martial arts 
 Jade Maiden Swordplay 
The Jade Maiden Swordplay was created by Lin Chaoying, who detailed the style in the Jade Maiden Heart Manual. It is the Ancient Tomb School's most powerful martial art, and is hence also its most protected one. Xiaolongnü was taught an incomplete version of this form of swordplay by Lin's apprentice, who did not master the art herself.

This style is believed to reflect Lin's grudge against Wang Chongyang, because its moves seem to be designed to attack the weak points in the Quanzhen Swordplay. However, later in the story, Yang Guo and Xiaolongnü discover that the Jade Maiden Swordplay actually complements the Quanzhen Swordplay by covering its weaknesses. This reflects Lin's true feelings; when the styles are performed together by a pair of lovers, it becomes a very powerful skill and the closer the couple are to each other, the more powerful the skill. Yang Guo and Xiaolongnü performed this skill together several times and defeated more powerful opponents, including Jinlun Guoshi. However, they became easy targets for their enemies whenever they were alone because they could not execute the Jade Maiden Swordplay without their partner. Nevertheless, after learning the Skill of Ambidexterity from Zhou Botong, Xiaolongnü was able to perform the combined styles alone with overwhelming speed, thereby reducing the need for Yang Guo to perform the swordplay with her.

Yang Guo later detailed the Jade Maiden Heart Manual in a book and gave it to Lu Wushuang as a gift for her to improve her martial arts.

 Fist of Beauties 
The Fist of Beauties is a graceful, elegant and seemingly harmless technique but is actually quite deadly. Its styles and moves are named after notable beauties in Chinese history.

 Palm of Infinity Web 
The Palm of Infinity Web is a swift defensive technique and was one of Lin Chaoying's secret skills. It involves moving the palms in a strange pattern and formation, seemingly creating an invisible web, which can confuse an enemy and halt any advances. Yang learns this technique from Xiaolongnü by catching sparrows in mid-flight.

 Qinggong 
The Ancient Tomb School's qinggong is among the fastest in the jianghu''.

Notes 

Organizations in Wuxia fiction